U-BeS (Hangul:유비스, acronym for You will be with us) was a South Korean boy band formed in 1997. The group consisted of four members: Jang Hogeun, Kim Mukyung, Lee Choongin, Kim Joonwoo. U-BeS is part of the first generation of modern Korean idol groups; groups that debuted the same year include S.E.S, Sechs Kies, N.R.G, Taesaja, and more.

The group released two full-length albums: U-BeS (1997) and You Will Be with Us (1998). Despite the group being inactive since 1999, U-BeS' disbandment has never been officially announced. Leader Hogeun eventually resumed his music career, and now performs as a trot singer under the moniker Jang Minho.

History 
1997–1999: Debut and disbandment

When the group debuted in 1997, the leader Hogeun and Kim Mukyung were university students, and the other two members were in high school. With releasing their first album, the group started to appear in many TV shows with the title track, Legend of the Stars. This song was written in memory of the younger brother of Lee Choongin, one of the members, who died young. Their choreography received huge attention that mixed the movements of kendo and Chinese martial arts. The group was also active in collaborating with other musicians, such as the Australian band Human Nature with producing a duet song.

They released their second studio album You Will Be with Us in 1998. However, the group split up due to poor album sales and disagreements with the agency.

2020–: Back in the spotlight

U-BeS is back in the spotlight almost 20 years after the disbandment when former leader Jang Minho appeared in Mr. Trot in 2020. Jang Minho's career as an idol-turned-trot singer has drawn attention. Along with Jang's rising popularity, former U-BeS fans have begun to visit the fan cafe again.  SBS hurriedly created Jang Minho's channel in their video archives to fill up the latest videos as well as the old U-BeS videos. Many '90s idols such as Bada (S.E.S), Tony Ahn (H.O.T), Koyote, g.o.d, NRG appeared on TV Chosun's Romantic Call Centre and Ppongsoonah School recalled and talked about U-BeS and Jang Minho at that time.

Discography

Studio albums

See also
Jang Minho

References 

South Korean boy bands
Musical groups established in 1997
South Korean dance music groups
South Korean idol groups